The 2011 Pan American Judo Championships was held in Guadalajara, Mexico at the CODE II Gymnasium from April 1–2, 2011. The event is being held as a test event for the 2011 Pan American Games. Also this event is one of the qualification event for the judo events at the 2011 Pan American Games.

Medal table

Men's events

Women's events 

*Only 4 athletes competed, so only one bronze medal was awarded.

Participating nations 
189 athletes representing 20 countries competed.

  (14)
  (14)
  (14)
  (9)
  (14)
  (3)
  (14)
  (7)
  (8)
  (7)
  (7)
  (7)
  (3)
  (16)
  (1)
  (10)
  (9)
  (16)
  (2)
  (14)

See also
Judo at the 2011 Pan American Games

References

External links
 

American Championships
Jud
2011
Judo competitions in Mexico
International sports competitions hosted by Mexico